Sammy Dale Dalton (born August 29, 1951) is an American educator and politician who served in both houses of the West Virginia Legislature. First elected to the House of Delegates as a 23-year old graduate student at Marshall University, he was elevated to the state senate in 1990. In 1994, his predecessor, Lloyd G. Jackson II, ran again and defeated him in the Democratic primary, after which Dalton returned to the House for two more terms. He attempted to win back a seat in the Senate in 2002 and 2012 but lost the primary races to Tracy Dempsey and Art Kirkendoll, respectively.

In 2021, Dalton was arrested on prostitution-related charges in a sting conducted by the Charleston Police Department.

References

1951 births
Living people
Democratic Party members of the West Virginia House of Delegates
Democratic Party West Virginia state senators
Marshall University alumni